Delta Sextantis (δ Sex, δ Sextantis) is a solitary star in the equatorial constellation of Sextans. With an annual parallax shift of 10.13 mas, it lies at a distance of around 322 light years from the Sun. This star is faintly visible to the naked eye, having an apparent visual magnitude of +5.25. According to the Bortle scale, that means it can be viewed from dark suburban skies.

This is a B-type main sequence star with a stellar classification of B9.5 V; just shy of being a cooler A-type star. It is estimated to have 2.6 times the Sun's mass and 2.3 times the radius of the Sun. It is 146 million years old, with a projected rotational velocity of 152 km/s. The star radiates 82 times the solar luminosity from its outer atmosphere at an effective temperature of 10,899 K.

References

Sextantis, Delta
Sextans (constellation)
B-type main-sequence stars
Durchmusterung objects
Sextantis, 29
090882
051362
04116